Vagif Shamamedovich Shirinov (born 12 November 1969) is a former Russian professional football player.

Club career
He played in the Russian Football National League for FC CSK VVS-Kristall Smolensk in 1997.

Honours
 Russian Third League Zone 2 top scorer: 1995 (21 goals).

External links
 

1969 births
Footballers from Baku
Living people
Soviet footballers
Russian footballers
Association football forwards
FC Salyut Belgorod players
Soviet Azerbaijani people
FC Slavyansk Slavyansk-na-Kubani players
FC Kristall Smolensk players
Neftçi PFK players